RRM may refer to:

 River and Rowing Museum in Henley-on-Thames, Oxfordshire, England
 Radio resource management
 RNA recognition motif
 Robotic Refueling Mission, carried by STS-135 to the International Space Station
 A Residential Reentry Management facility, the term used by the U.S. Bureau of Prisons for a halfway house